William Tell is a hero in Swiss legend.

William Tell may also refer to:
 William Tell (play), a drama by Friedrich Schiller
 William Tell (opera), by Gioacchino Rossini, based on Schiller's play
 William Tell Overture, from Rossini's opera
 William Tell (musician), a rock artist
 William Tell (aerial gunnery competition), a fighter aircraft tournament

Literature
 William Tell (1825 play), a play by the Irish writer James Sheridan Knowles
 William Tell, a 1996 children's book by author and illustrator Leonard Everett Fisher

Film and television
 Adventures of William Tell, a French film (1898)
 William Tell (1903 film), a French film
 William Tell (1923 film), a German film
 William Tell (1934 film), a Swiss-German film
 William Tell (1949 film), an Italian film
 William Tell (1956 film), an Austrian film featuring Albin Skoda
 William Tell (1960 film), a Swiss film
 The Adventures of William Tell, a 1958-59 British television series
 William Tell/The Adventures of William Tell, a 1987-89 multinational television series released in the UK as Crossbow
 The New Adventures of William Tell, a 1992 animated television film produced by Burbank Animation Studios
 The Legend of William Tell, a 1998 New Zealand television series
 The Story of William Tell, a 1953 unfinished film starring Errol Flynn

See also
 Guillaume Tell (disambiguation)
 Guillermo Tell (1929), a painting by Surrealist painter Salvador Dalí in which represents his ongoing conflict with his father